The Saint John River is one of the six main rivers in the West African nation of Liberia. With its headwaters in neighboring Guinea, the river flows generally southwest through Liberia and empties into the Atlantic Ocean at Bassa Cove near Edina in Grand Bassa County. The  river has a drainage basin covering .

Course
The headwaters of the river are in the Nimba Range of the Guinea Highlands in the country of Guinea and flow south towards the border with Liberia. Near Yalata, Guinea it begins to form the border between Guinea and Bong County in Liberia. Flowing generally south, it forms the international boundary for around 6 miles. At Niatande, Liberia, it meets the Mani River and enters Liberia, forming the boundary between Bong and Nimba counties. The river then flows to the southwest for approximately  before turning to the southeast for a  stretch. Near Zahn it takes a small river, and turns southwest again.

After about  it begins to form the boundary between Bong and Grand Bassa counties and turns west for about 10 miles. The river then continues to the southwest, and after approximately  it enters Grand Bassa County. After around  it turns south for eight miles (13 km) and then flows back to the southwest for approximately 10 miles. Near Shoigabli it turns due south for about  where it passes Mount Finley and turns more westerly and flows generally southwest for another 9 miles. Between Zoblum and Alfabli the Saint John widens and flows to the northwest for around  before heading west for a mile to Hartford. The river then dives to the southwest for its final 6.5 miles. Here it receives the Mechlin and Benson rivers as it empties into the Atlantic Ocean near Edina and Buchanan.

Details
At  in length, it is one of the six main or major rivers of Liberia. There are only 16 rivers in the country total. During the wet season in October, flows average , while in February during the dry season the flows average  at the same location.

Flowing generally southwest from its source to the ocean it contains occasional rapids and a waterfall. The river received its name from Portuguese explorers in the 15th Century who spotted the mouth on St. John's feast day.

Aquatic life
The Saint John River has a variety of aquatic life in and along the shores over the length to the river. Species include the Slender-snouted Crocodile on inland portions of the waterway. There are at least 65 species of fish in the river, including species of Mastacembelidae, Barbus eburneensis, Chrysichthys johnelsi, Killifish, Electric catfish, Nile perch, and Tilapia among others. Birds also use the riverbanks and islands as nesting grounds, including the Three-cusped Pangolin, Palaearctic, Sandpipers, Greenshanks, Little Ringed Plover, and Water Chevrotain in the Kpatawee Wetlands area in Bong County.

References

Rivers of Liberia
Rivers of Guinea
Grand Bassa County
International rivers of Africa
Guinea–Liberia border
Border rivers